El don de Alba is a Spanish supernatural television series consisting of a remake of the American series Ghost Whisperer, starring Patricia Montero, Martiño Rivas and Antonio Hortelano. Produced by Disney Media Distribution for Telecinco, it aired in 2013.

Premise 
The fiction follows Alba Rivas (Patricia Montero), a young woman tasked with the mission of helping the dead ones to cross to "the other side" after the death of her grandmother. Just arrived to the village of "Bellavista", Alba counts with help from Gabriel Vega (Antonio Hortelano), an employee at the municipal archives with a great deal of interest in the supernatural. Meanwhile, she establishes a relationship with Pablo Escudero (Martiño Rivas), a sceptical physician who has just graduated.

Cast 
  as Alba Rivas.
 Martiño Rivas as Pablo Escudero.
  as Gabriel Vega.
 Itsaso Arana as Andrea Santos.
 Carmela Poch as Nuria Guerrero.
  as Alicia Ramos.
  as Ramón Ramon.
  as the "Faceless Man".

Production and release 
Consisting of an adaptation of the American series Ghost Whisperer, El don de Alba was produced by Disney Media Distribution for Telecinco. Filming began in 2012. The series premiered on 9 April 2013 in prime time. Interest in the series progressively waned, ending its intermittent broadcasting run on 16 July 2013, averaging 1,641,923 viewers and a 9.2% audience share across its 13 episodes.

References 

Spanish television series based on American television series
2013 Spanish television series debuts
2013 Spanish television series endings
2010s Spanish drama television series
Spanish fantasy television series
Telecinco network series
2010s supernatural television series
Spanish-language television shows
Television series about ghosts